Below is a list of governors of the Central Provinces and Berar and the precursor offices associated with that title:

Chief Commissioners of Nagpur Province and Saugor Nerbudda territories
1861–1862: Edward King Elliot

Chief Commissioners of the Central Provinces
1862–1864: Edward King Elliot
1864–1867: Sir Richard Temple, Bt.
1867–1883: Sir John Henry Morris
1883–1884: William Bence Jones
1884–1885: Sir Charles Haukes Todd
1885–1887: Dennis Fitzpatrick
1887–1889: Alexander Mackenzie
1889–1893: Sir Antony Patrick Macdonnell
1893–1895: Sir John Woodburn
1895–1898: Sir Charles James Lyall
1898–1899: Sir Denzil Charles Jelf Ibbetson
1899–1902: Sir Andrew Henderson Leith Fraser
1902–1904: John Prescott Hewett
1904–1905: Frederic Styles Philpin Lely
1905–1906: John Ontario Miller
1907–1912: Reginald Henry Craddock
1912–1920: Sir Benjamin Robertson
1920: Sir Frank George Sly

Governors of the Central Provinces
1920–1925: Sir Frank George Sly
1925–1932: Sir Montagu Sherard Dawes Butler
1932–1936: Sir Hyde Clarendon Gowan

Governors of the Central Provinces and Berar
1936–1938: Sir Hyde Clarendon Gowan (Edpuanti Raghavendra Rao from 15.05.1936 to 11.09.1936 Acting governor in place of Gowan)
 11.09.1936–03.03.1938: Sir Hyde Clarendon Gowan
03.03.1938–27.05.1938: Sir Hugh Bomford (acting)
01.06.1938–01.07.1940: Sir Francis Verner Wylie
17.09.1940–16.09.1946: Sir Henry Joseph Twynam
16.09.1946–15.08.1947: Sir Frederick Chalmers Bourne

References

History of Nagpur